Olmesartan, sold under the trade name Benicar among others, is a medication used to treat high blood pressure, heart failure, and diabetic kidney disease. It is a reasonable initial treatment for high blood pressure. It is taken by mouth. Versions are available as the combination olmesartan/hydrochlorothiazide and olmesartan/amlodipine.

Common side effects include dizziness, headaches, diarrhea, and back pain. Serious side effects may include kidney problems, low blood pressure, and angioedema. Use in pregnancy may harm the fetus and use when breastfeeding is not recommended. It is an angiotensin II receptor antagonist and works by blocking the effects of angiotensin II.

It was patented in 1991 and came into medical use in 2002. It is available as a generic medication. In 2020, it was the 139th most commonly prescribed medication in the United States, with more than 4million prescriptions.

Medical uses
Olmesartan is used for the treatment of hypertension. It may be used alone or in combination with other antihypertensive agents.
The U.S. Food and Drug Administration (FDA) has determined that the benefits of olmesartan continue to outweigh its potential risks when used for the treatment of patients with high blood pressure according to the drug label.

Contraindications

Contraindications for treatment with olmesartan include biliary obstruction. Another major contraindication is pregnancy; reports in the scientific literature reveal fetal malformations for pregnant women taking sartan-derived drugs.

Adverse effects
The incidence of adverse effects with Benicar (the US trade name for olmesartan medoxomil) is reported as similar to placebo; the only adverse effect that occurred in >1% of patients treated with it and more frequently than placebo was dizziness (3% vs 1%).  Rarely, olmesartan can cause severe gastrointestinal issues. The symptoms, which include nausea, vomiting, diarrhea, weight loss, and electrolyte abnormalities, are common among those who have celiac disease. Recent studies suggested this form of sprue-like enteropathy could be caused by the inhibition of TGF-β, a polypeptide cytokine that maintains intestinal homeostasis. However, it is still unclear why this action was never observed with other ARBs. In studies of angiotensin II receptor antagonists such as olmesartan, patients with unilateral or bilateral renal artery stenosis, increases in serum creatinine or blood urea nitrogen have been reported. There has been no long-term use of olmesartan medoxomil in patients with unilateral or bilateral renal artery stenosis, but similar results may be expected.

The full prescribing information for Benicar notes as with all drugs that act directly on the renin-angiotensin system, olmesartan is contraindicated in pregnancy and can cause injury and even death to the developing fetus.

Chemistry
An ester prodrug, it is completely and rapidly hydrolyzed to its active acid form. The metabolites in this process are carbon dioxide and 2,3-dione.

Dosage and administration
The usual recommended starting dose of olmesartan is 20 mg once daily. The dose may be increased to 40 mg after two weeks of therapy, if further reduction in blood pressure is desirable. Doses above 40 mg do not appear to have greater effect, and twice-daily dosing offers no advantage over the same total dose given once daily. No adjustment of dosage is typically necessary for advanced age, renal impairment, or hepatic dysfunction. For patients with possible depletion of intravascular volume (e.g., patients treated with diuretics), olmesartan should be initiated with caution; consideration should be given to use of a lower starting dose in such cases. If blood pressure is not controlled by olmesartan alone, a diuretic may be added. Olmesartan may be administered with other antihypertensive agents. Olmesartan may be administered with or without food.

Society and culture
Olmesartan and Sevikar HCT combined is marketed worldwide by Daiichi Sankyo, in India by Abbott Healthcare Pvt. Ltd. under the trade name WinBP,  by Zydus Cadila under the trade name Olmy, by Ranbaxy Laboratories Ltd. under the trade name Olvance, Olsar by Unichem Laboratories and in Canada by Schering-Plough as Olmetec.

Several preparations containing olmesartan and other antihypertensives are available. Teva Pharmaceuticals produces a formulation containing olmesartan, amlodipine, and hydrochlorothiazide for once daily use. Benicar HCT is the brand name of a medication containing olmesartan medoxomil with hydrochlorothiazide. Benitec H, another medication containing olmesartan medoxomil and hydrochlorothiazide, is marketed by GlaxoSmithKline in India.

History

It was patented in 1991 and came into medical use in 2002.

References

External links
 

Angiotensin II receptor antagonists
Imidazoles
Tetrazoles
Carboxylate esters
Tertiary alcohols
Biphenyls
1995 in biotechnology
Daiichi Sankyo
Merck & Co. brands
Wikipedia medicine articles ready to translate